Vlaamse Erfgoedbibliotheek or Flanders Heritage Library is a library consortium in the Flemish Region of Belgium bringing together six institutions with considerable holdings of manuscripts and old printed books. The network was founded in 2008, and was authorised as a heritage organisation for Flanders in 2012.

Members
The libraries associated in the network are:
 Hendrik Conscience Heritage Library in Antwerp
 Antwerp University Library
 Bruges Public Library
 Ghent University Library
 Hasselt Limburg Library (the former provincial library for Limburg)
 KU Leuven University Library

Databases
The consortium is involved in building and maintaining a number of databases, most importantly:
 Abraham Catalogue of Belgian Newspapers, an online catalogue of historic Belgian newspapers (1830–1950), with many partner libraries across Flanders and Brussels
 Flandrica.be, an online repository of material from and about the area that is now Flanders, partnering with the libraries of the Antwerp Museum for Diamonds, Jewellery and Silver and the Plantin-Moretus Museum
 Short Title Catalogue Flanders (STCV), which aims to create a short-title catalogue of everything printed in the Southern Netherlands before 1801

The Flanders Heritage Library is also a partner of the Digital Library for Dutch Literature.

References

External links
 

Library consortia
Heritage organizations in Belgium
2008 establishments in Belgium